Masis, Massis, or MASIS may refer to:
 Masis (given name)
 Massis (surname)
 Mount Ararat, a mountain in Turkey historically known as Masis by the Armenians
 Masis, Armenia, a city in Ararat Province, Armenia
 Masis (village), a village in Ararat Province, Armenia
 FC Masis, a defunct football club in Armenia
 Massis (weekly), an Armenian publication in Los Angeles, CA
 Massis (periodical), an Armenian Catholic publication in Beirut, Lebanon
 , an Armenian Ottoman publication (1852–1908), first established as Hayasdan, published in Constantinople (now Istanbul)
 Memory and SMS interface standard (where "SMS" stands for "STAR Memory System", and "STAR" in turn stands for "Self-Test and Repair"), a specialized hardware description language created by Synopsys for the purpose of describing random-access memory structures in integrated circuit design.

Massifs
Massís del Besiberri, also known as Besiberri Massif 
Massís de Cardó, also known as Cardó Massif
Massís Centrau, also known as Massif Central
Massís del Garraf, also known as Garraf Massif
Massís de les Gavarres, also known as Gavarres
Massís del Montgrí, also known as Montgrí Massif
Massís del Caroig, also known as Massís del Caroig